The 1997–98 Belgian Hockey League season was the 78th season of the Belgian Hockey League, the top level of ice hockey in Belgium. Eight teams participated in the league, and HYC Herentals won the championship.

Regular season
 
 (* Olympia Heist op den Berg had two points deducted)

Playoffs

Semifinals 
 IHC Leuven - Griffoens Geel 3:4/5:4
 Olympia Heist op den Berg - HYC Herentals 5:8/3:10

3rd place 
 Griffoens Geel - Olympia Heist op den Berg 10:7/4:9

Final 
 IHC Leuven - HYC Herentals 2:13/1:8

Federation Cup (5th place)

Semifinals
 Phantoms Deurne II - Brussels Royal IHSC 6:0/13:1
 Yeti Bears Eeklo - White Caps Turnhout 10:6/11:5

7th place
 White Caps Turnhout - Brussels Royal IHSC 16:5/10:0

5th place
 Yeti Bears Eeklo - Phantoms Deurne II 6:4/7:6

References
Season on hockeyarchives.info

Belgian Hockey League
Belgian Hockey League seasons
Bel